Carmelita González (July 11, 1928 – April 30, 2010) was a Mexican lead actress known for her film roles during the Golden Age of Mexican cinema.  She appeared in nearly 100 Mexican films during her career, opposite such actors as Mario Moreno Cantinflas, Pedro Infante and Jorge Negrete. González began her career by earning $21 but went on to win an Ariel Award for Best Supporting Actress for her 1984 performance in Luis Mandoki's Motel.

Golden age of Mexican cinema
Carmelita González made her debut in 1945 with Camino de Sacramento which starred Negrete. Because she was uncredited, González only earned $21. She earned her first film credit as Carmelita González in 1946 alongside comedian Cantinflas in Soy un prófugo. Active throughout the Golden Age of Mexican cinema, González's film credits included 1952's Dos tipos de cuidado, co-starring Jorge Negrete and Pedro Infante. Her role as Rosario, a rape victim, in Dos tipos de cuidado garnered a Diosa de Plata (Silver Goddess Award) and considered a major performance. González would appear uncredited with Mario Moreno in 1956's Around the World in 80 Days. Her contemporary actresses were Charito Granados, Esther Fernández and Marga López. Appearing during the Golden Age of Mexican cinema, these contemporaries like González were atypical heroines ahead of their time.

In 1952, González starred in Huracán Ramírez, which was a black-and-white movie, in the then emerging genre of lucha libre masked wrestler films. During the 1940s, a series of movies beginning with El Santo and El Hijo del Santo in 1942 popularized lucha libre, literally free-style fighting, masked wrestlers. González would go on to star in the 1962 El misterio de Huracán Ramírez, 1966 El Hijo de Huracán Ramírez and 1967 La venganza de Huracán Ramirez remakes.

Telenovela career
González later worked on Mexican television, including telenovelas.  She appeared as a supporting actress in various roles on the telenovelas Así son ellas, Amar otra vez and Alegrijes y rebujos. González' last appearances were on Amar Otra Vez in 2004 as her health began to wane.

Early life

Gonzalez was born in Mexico City on July 11, 1928. Her father insisted upon her earning a college degree in Industrial relations but González studied English and French in the United States. He initially opposed her desire to work in field of drama but won the approval of her mother and appeared in the movie Bésame mucho. González was married briefly to Eduardo Fajardo with whom she bore a daughter, Paloma del Rocío.

Final years and death
González died of pneumonia at 5 am on April 30, 2010, at the hospital Santelena in Mexico City, where she had been hospitalized for several days. She had been recovering from intestinal problems.  She was 81 years old.

Filmography

References

External links

1928 births
2010 deaths
Mexican film actresses
Mexican telenovela actresses
Actresses from Mexico City
20th-century Mexican actresses
21st-century Mexican actresses
Deaths from pneumonia in Mexico